The Woman by the Dark Window is a 1960 West German drama film directed by Franz Peter Wirth and starring Marianne Koch, Christiane Nielsen and Robert Graf.

It was made at the Wandsbek Studios by the Hamburg-based company Real Film. The film's sets were designed by the art directors Albrecht Becker and Herbert Kirchhoff.

Cast
 Marianne Koch as Luise Konradin
 Christiane Nielsen as Karin Becker
 Robert Graf as Thomas Melchior
 Heinz Drache as Andreas Wegner
 Alice Treff as Frau Konradin
 Hans Paetsch as Dr. Mertens
 Fritz Schröder-Jahn as Gerichtsvorsitzender
 Erwin Linder as Brasch

References

Bibliography 
 Bock, Hans-Michael & Bergfelder, Tim. The Concise Cinegraph: Encyclopaedia of German Cinema. Berghahn Books, 2009.

External links 
 

1960 films
1960 drama films
German drama films
West German films
1960s German-language films
Films directed by Franz Peter Wirth
Real Film films
Films shot at Wandsbek Studios
1960s German films